Killingworth Village is a small village in the borough of North Tyneside in the United Kingdom. It lies between Forest Hall to the south and the modern Killingworth, which derives its name from the village, to the north. The West Lane runs through the village from Forest Hall and on to Backworth. For local government, it is located within Killingworth ward.

St John's Church 
Until the mid nineteenth century the village was part of Longbenton parish, but became a parish in its own right in 1865. Four years later, in 1869, Killingworth parish church was built; it was designed by London architect Bassett Keeling, and named St John's after John the Evangelist. The walls are built of sandstone, adorned with red bands, and the roof is Welsh slate. The building cost £2032 (or roughly £250,000 in 2021 sterling). It was inaugurated on 28 December 1869, one day after St John's feast day.

Public houses 
There are two pubs in Killingworth Village: the Plough and the Killingworth Arms. The two establishments are a mere two hundred and fifty metres apart. Killingworth Arms Football Club is a Sunday league team, in the North East Sunday Football League Division D.

References

External links

 "Sitelines" (Newcastle local history site), page includes records of historical activity in the Killingworth Village area
 Killingworth Photos and Videos group on Facebook contains over 680 old and new local photos, school photos, 11 videos and discussion

Villages in Tyne and Wear
Metropolitan Borough of North Tyneside